The 2009 W-League season was the second season of the W-League, the Australian national women's football (soccer) competition.  The season was played over 10 rounds followed by a finals series. Sydney FC were both the champions and premiers after finishing the regular season at the top of the table and defeating Brisbane Roar 3–2 in the grand final.

Clubs

W-League teams for the 2009 season:

Regular season
The 2009 W-League season was played over 10 rounds, followed by a finals series involving the four highest placed teams, starting in October and completing in December 2009.

League table

Fixtures
Individual matches are collated at each club's season article.

Finals series

Bracket

Semi-finals

Final

Season statistics

Leading scorers

Awards
Player of the Year: Michelle Heyman, Central Coast Mariners
Young Player of the Year: Elise Kellond-Knight, Brisbane Roar and Ellyse Perry, Canberra United
Player's Player of the Year: Samantha Kerr, Perth Glory
Goalkeeper of the Year: Jillian Loyden, Central Coast Mariners
Golden Boot: Michelle Heyman, Central Coast Mariners – 11 goals
Goal of the Year: Samantha Kerr, Perth Glory – Round 8 (Perth Glory v Sydney FC)
Fair Play Award: Sydney FC and Canberra United
Referee of the Year: Kate Jacewicz
Coach of the Year: Ray Junna, Canberra United and Stephen Roche, Central Coast Mariners

See also

 Adelaide United W-League season 2009
 Brisbane Roar W-League season 2009
 Canberra United W-League season 2009
 Central Coast Mariners W-League season 2009
 Melbourne Victory W-League season 2009
 Newcastle Jets W-League season 2009
 Perth Glory W-League season 2009
 Sydney FC W-League season 2009

Notes

References

 
Aus
A-League Women seasons
1